Latin Pop Albums is a record chart published on Billboard magazine. It features Latin music information of the Pop music genre. Established in June 1985, this chart features only full-length albums and like all album charts on Billboard, is based on sales. The information is compiled by Nielsen SoundScan from a sample that represents more than 90% of the U.S. music retail market which includes not only music stores and the music departments at electronics and department stores, but also direct-to-consumer transactions and Internet sales (both physical albums via Internet, and ones bought via digital downloads). A limited array of verifiable sales from concert venues is also tabulated. On the week ending January 26, 2017, Billboard updated the methodology to compile the Latin Pop Albums chart into a multi-metric methodology to include track equivalent album units and streaming equivalent albums units.

Reflexiones by José José was the first album to reach number-one on the chart.
The current number one album is Ones by Selena

Year-end best selling albums 

Romance by Luis Miguel was number one chart Latin pop album since June 29, 1985 to June 25, 1994. 
Fijación Oral Vol. 1 by Shakira was the best-selling Latin pop album of the decade 2000–2009.

See also
Top Latin Albums
Hot Latin Songs

References
General

  For information about every week of this chart, follow this link; in the "refine your results" section select the chart date and all positions for the week selected will appear on screen.

Specific

External links
 Official Billboard website

Billboard charts
Latin pop albums